The Orangutan Land Trust is a UK charity with the objective of providing sustainable solutions for the long-term survival of the orangutan in the wild by ensuring safe areas of forest for their continued existence. The organization's President and co-founder, Lone Drøscher Nielsen, is a prominent wildlife conservationist.

Projects under development

Salat Island
A major objective of Orangutan Land Trust is to secure the river island known as Salat Island in Central Kalimantan to provide a habitat in which orangutans undergoing the rehabilitation process can refine their skills before being released in the wild. Additionally, a part of this island can serve as a permanent sanctuary for those rescued orangutans who can never be released, such as those with chronic disease or disabilities.

East Kalimantan Ecosystem Restoration Concessions
Borneo Orangutan Survival is one of the Indonesian NGOs seeking ways of reducing emissions from deforestation and degradation (REDD). It has acquired from the Department of Forestry and Ecosystem Restoration Concession with the intention of using the forest area as a release site for rehabilitated orangutans from its Samboja Lestari and Wanariset projects in East Kalimantan (over 200 individuals). The concession is 86,000 hectares of the ex-PT Mugi Triman International (MGI) timber concession. Releases begin in May 2012.

Central Kalimantan Ecosystem Restoration Projects
Orangutan Land Trust are working with the Green Line Corporation in Indonesia to secure 80,000 hectares of mostly degraded and deforested peat forest in Central Kalimantan as an Ecosystem Restoration Concession, in order to provide sanctuary for at least 200 orangutans rescued and rehabilitated by the Borneo Orangutan Survival Foundation's Nyaru Menteng Project.

Sabah, Malaysia
The Malua Wildlife Habitat Conservation Bank (Malua BioBank) is located next to one of the last areas of virgin rainforest in Sabah, Malaysia, on the island of Borneo. The Malua BioBank will restore and protect  of critical orangutan habitat called the Malua Forest Reserve.

References

External links
 Orangutan Land Trust website
 savetheorangutan.org Borneo Orangutan Survival website
 Sabah Environmental Trust

Animal charities based in the United Kingdom
Animal conservation organizations
Balikpapan
Nature conservation in Indonesia
Nature conservation in Malaysia
Environmental charities based in the United Kingdom
Foreign charities operating in Malaysia
Foreign charities operating in the Philippines
Land trusts
 
Orangutan conservation
Primate sanctuaries